John Almon (17 December 1737 – 12 December 1805) was an English journalist and writer on political subjects, notable for his efforts to secure the right to publish reports on the debates in Parliament.

He was born in Liverpool and came to London, where in 1761 he was a reporter for the Gazetteer, and published A Review of Mr. Pitt's Administration, which was popular with the opposition. In 1770 he reprinted a letter of "Junius", for which he was put on trial and by a jury found guilty, although it is unclear what, if anything, was his punishment.

During the American Revolution, in the year 1776, J. Almon published the "Journal of the Proceedings of the Congress Held at Philadelphia May 10, 1775", which was originally published in Philadelphia in 1775 by order of the Congress. He also published a monthly series of papers entitled The Remembrancer on events in America. In 1784 he established a newspaper, the General Advertiser, but it was unsuccessful. He published Biographical, Literary, and Political Anecdotes in 1797, and his Correspondence with friend John Wilkes appeared posthumously.

See also

 Letters of Junius

External links

A Review of Mr. Pitt's Administration From the Collections at the Library of Congress
 Eighteenth-century German edition of the Junius letters: "Die Briefe des Junius nach der zwoten ächten und vermehrten Ausgabe, aus dem Englischen übersetzet", Mietau und Leipzig, 1776
 Political opposition and publishing – the trial of bookseller and journalist John Almon in 1770
 Deborah Rogers, John Almon:  Bookseller as Rogue https://www.amazon.com/Bookseller-Rogue-Eighteenth-Century-Publishing-University/dp/0820402214/ref=sr_1_1?ie=UTF8&qid=1490715002&sr=8-1&keywords=john+almon%3A++bookseller+as+rogue

References

English male journalists
English political writers
1737 births
1805 deaths
Journalists from Liverpool
English male non-fiction writers
English social commentators